Andre's clawed frog (Xenopus andrei) is a species of frog in the family Pipidae. It is known with certainty only from coastal Cameroon (where its type locality, Longyi, near Kribi), northeastern Gabon, western Central African Republic, and northwestern Angola. It presumably occurs in the intervening Republic of the Congo, Democratic Republic of the Congo, and Equatorial Guinea.

Its natural habitats are lowland forests where it occurs in water, in small water holes, shady swamps, and pools. It is locally harvested for food.

References

Xenopus
Amphibians described in 1983
Amphibians of Angola
Amphibians of Cameroon
Amphibians of the Central African Republic
Amphibians of Gabon
Taxonomy articles created by Polbot
Frogs of Africa